South Mansfield is a village in DeSoto Parish, Louisiana, United States. The population was 346 at the 2010 census. It is part of the Shreveport–Bossier City Metropolitan Statistical Area.

Geography
South Mansfield is located in central DeSoto Parish at  (32.016740, −93.722903). It is bordered to the north by the city of Mansfield, the parish seat.

Demographics

As of the census of 2000, there were 352 people, 154 households, and 93 families residing in the village. The racial makeup of the village was 24.43% White, 73.86% African American, 0.57% Native American, 0.28% Asian, and 0.85% from two or more races. Hispanic or Latino of any race were 2.27% of the population.

There were 154 households, out of which 29.2% had children under the age of 18 living with them, 21.4% were married couples living together, 33.1% had a female householder with no husband present, and 39.0% were non-families. 35.7% of all households were made up of individuals, and 20.1% had someone living alone who was 65 years of age or older. The average household size was 2.29 and the average family size was 2.93.

In the village, the population was spread out, with 30.1% under the age of 18, 9.7% from 18 to 24, 22.7% from 25 to 44, 19.9% from 45 to 64, and 17.6% who were 65 years of age or older. The median age was 34 years. For every 100 females, there were 62.2 males. For every 100 females age 18 and over, there were 61.8 males.

The median income for a household in the village was $12,417, and the median income for a family was $24,375. Males had a median income of $25,909 versus $14,000 for females. The per capita income for the village was $11,069. About 44.9% of families and 46.3% of the population were below the poverty line, including 52.4% of those under age 18 and 40.0% of those age 65 or over.

References

Villages in Louisiana
Villages in DeSoto Parish, Louisiana
Villages in Shreveport – Bossier City metropolitan area